Greece competed at the World Games 2017  in Wrocław, Poland, from 20 July 2017 to 30 July 2017.

Medalists

Competitors

Gymnastic

Rhythmic Gymnastics
Greece  has qualified at the 2017 World Games:

Women's individual event - 1 quota

Water skiing 

Marie Vympranietsova won the silver medal in the women's jump event.

References 

Nations at the 2017 World Games
2017 in Greek sport
2017